Surrey Downs may refer to
 North Downs, a ridge of chalk hills in south east England
 Surrey Downs, South Australia, a suburb of Adelaide